Le Tâche (1,691 m) is a mountain of the Chablais Alps, overlooking the Rhone valley at Vouvry, in the canton of Valais. It lies east of the Lac de Taney.

References

External links
Le Tâche on Hikr

Mountains of the Alps
Mountains of Valais
Mountains of Switzerland
One-thousanders of Switzerland